The Wizard and the Witch is a children's fantasy book written by Jean Ure. It is the final book of The Wizard trilogy and was published in 1995.

Plot
It is “All Spells Night” and Jr. Wizard Ben Muzzy returns to his friends Joel and Gemma for a night of mischief. Nothing goes as planned, however, as he encounters a bumbling old witch named Grimwade, who can't seem to cast spells correctly.

External links
Google Books

1995 British novels
1995 children's books
British children's novels
Candlewick Press books
Children's fantasy novels
Witchcraft in written fiction
Wizards in fiction